Vital Nadziewski (born 20 October 1981) is a retired Belarusian professional footballer. His latest club was Lida in 2013.

References

External links

1981 births
Living people
Belarusian footballers
FC Neman Grodno players
FC Gomel players
Olimpia Elbląg players
Belarusian expatriate footballers
Expatriate footballers in Poland
Belarusian expatriate sportspeople in Poland
FC Lida players
Association football defenders
Association football midfielders